The Östergötland Cavalry Regiment was a Swedish Army cavalry regiment with origins that traces back to the 16th century. In 1791, they were merged with another unit to form a new regiment. The regiment's soldiers were recruited from the province of Östergötland.

History 
The regiment has its origins in fänikor (companies) raised in Östergötland in the 16th century. In 1619, these units—along with fänikor from the nearby Jönköping County—were organised by Gustav II Adolf into Östergötlands storregemente. Sometime between 1623 and 1628, the grand regiment was permanently split into three smaller regiments, of which Östergötland Cavalry Regiment was one.

The regiment was officially raised in 1636 although it had existed since the 1620s. Östergötland Cavalry Regiment was one of the original 8 Swedish cavalry regiments mentioned in the Swedish constitution of 1634. The regiment's first commander was Hans Rotkirch. It was allotted in 1687.

Östgöta Cavalry Regiment was merged with Östergötland Infantry Regiment in 1791 to form the Life Grenadier Regiment. The reorganisation and renaming to a "life grenadier" title of honour was conducted in regard to the regiment's achievements during Gustav III's Russian War. Östgöta Cavalry Regiment was renamed to Livgrenadjärregementets rusthållsdivision and retained some form of semi-independence.

Organisation 

1634(?)
Livkompaniet
Överstelöjtnantens kompani
Majorens kompani
Vadstena kompani
Vifolka kompani
Skänninge kompani
Västanstångs kompani
Tjusts kompani

17??
Livkompaniet
Tjusts kompani
Linköpings kompani
Västanstångs kompani
Bergslags kompani
Vifolka Klosters kompani
Skänninge kompani
Vadstena kompani

Name, designation and garrison

See also 
List of Swedish regiments
Provinces of Sweden

References 
Print

Online

Notes 

Cavalry regiments of the Swedish Army
Disbanded units and formations of Sweden
Military units and formations established in 1636
Military units and formations disestablished in 1791